Sebastian discography may refer to:
 Sebastian discography, French musician Sébastien Akchoté (born 1981)
 List of compositions by Johann Sebastian Bach, German composer (1685 – 1750)
 Belle and Sebastian discography, Scottish indie pop band
 Sebastian Bach discography, Canadian heavy metal singer, (born 1968)
 Guy Sebastian discography, Australian pop singer (born 1981)
 Sebastián Yatra discography, Colombian pop singer (born 1994)
 Sebastian Ingrosso discography, Swedish DJ (born 1983)
 Sebastian Arocha Morton production discography, American composer